Leon Lafayette Brogden Sr. (August 26, 1910 – October 1, 2000) was an American high school football, basketball and baseball coach in Edenton, Wilson and Wilmington, North Carolina.  His most famous products are two quarterbacks: Roman Gabriel, who spent 16 seasons in the National Football League (NFL), and Sonny Jurgensen, who was inducted into the Pro Football Hall of Fame in 1983.

Career

In 1935, Brogden began his coaching career in Edenton, North Carolina and later moved to Wilson, North Carolina]] for nine years and then to in 1945 Wilmington North Carolina, where he coached for 30 years.

While best remembered as a basketball coach, Brogden won 55 state titles across three sports.

In his book, Multiple Offenses and Defenses, North Carolina Tar Heels coach Dean Smith said that he and his coaches, while scouting, noticed Brogden's New Hanover basketball team using the 1–4 offensive set (one guard high and four players spanning the court at the foul line) and later incorporated that set into their own offenses at North Carolina.

Recognition

Brogden was inducted into the Wake Forest University's Sports Hall of Fame in 1974, the North Carolina Sports Hall of Fame in 197 and The Greater Wilmington Sports Hall of Fame in 2006.0

Legacy

The main gym of New Hanover High School as well as the county's annual December basketball championship are named after him.

References

External links
 

1910 births
2000 deaths
Wake Forest Demon Deacons football coaches
Wake Forest Demon Deacons football players
High school baseball coaches in the United States
High school basketball coaches in North Carolina
High school football coaches in North Carolina
People from Edenton, North Carolina
People from Wake County, North Carolina
Sportspeople from Wilmington, North Carolina
Coaches of American football from North Carolina
Players of American football from North Carolina
Baseball coaches from North Carolina
Basketball coaches from North Carolina